Jacuizinho is a municipality in the state of Rio Grande do Sul in the Southern Region of Brazil. It was raised to municipality status in 1997, the area being taken out of the municipalities of Salto do Jacuí and Espumoso.

Its estimated population in 2020 was 2,706 inhabitants.

See also
List of municipalities in Rio Grande do Sul

References

Municipalities in Rio Grande do Sul